Kathleen Williams (born February 16, 1961) is an American politician from Montana. A member of the Democratic Party, she served in the nonpartisan Environmental Quality Council of the Montana Legislature and the Montana Department of Fish, Wildlife and Parks. In 2010, she was elected to the Montana House of Representatives and served three two-year terms before retiring. In 2018 and 2020, Williams ran, unsuccessfully, as the Democratic nominee for Montana's at-large seat in the United States House of Representatives.

Early life and education
Williams was born February 16, 1961, in a United States Army hospital in California. Her father was a U.S. Army soldier who served in World War II; much of her childhood was spent as a "military brat". When Williams was 11 years old, her 49-year-old mother was diagnosed with Alzheimer's disease. Williams assisted her father in caring for her mother, who died when Williams was in her teens.

Williams enrolled at the University of California, Berkeley. Taking her father's advice, she intended to earn a degree in business administration. After taking a class in forestry, she realized she was far more interested in natural resource policy. She switched majors, and graduated in 1983 with a Bachelor of Science in natural resource economics. After holding a series of jobs, Williams enrolled at Colorado State University where she received a master's degree in recreation resources. Her graduate thesis analyzed how much water was needed to support recreation on a wild and scenic river.

Early career
Williams worked for a time for the United States Forest Service as well as several private conservation and recreation organizations in the west. She moved to Montana in 1995 to take a position as nonpartisan lead staffer at the Environmental Quality Council (EQC), a bipartisan committee of the Montana Legislature. She focused on mining policy, recreation policy, and water quality issues for the committee. As an EQC staffer, she also served as a member of the staff of the Montana House of Representatives Committee on Natural Resources, where she took the lead on water policy issues.

Williams left the Environmental Quality Council after four years and took a job in 1999 as a Water Program Manager with the Montana Department of Fish, Wildlife and Parks. Her work focused on improving water flows and water quality in streams with low water flows. Williams served as the department's representative on the Governor's Drought Advisory Committee in 2003. She left the department in 2004 to become executive director of the Instream Flow Council, a nonprofit association of provincial, state, and territorial fish and wildlife agencies in the United States and Canada.

Williams also founded and managed Jetway Geographer, which published natural history guides and distributed them on airplanes.

Montana state legislature
In 2007, the Montana state legislature adjourned without passing a state budget, deadlocked over how to spend a $1.4 billion surplus. A budget was passed only after a three-day special session. Angered by the legislature's inaction, Williams decided to run for office.

2010 election
Williams was first elected to the Montana Legislature in 2010. She ran in House district 65, a heavily Democratic district which covered the southeast part of the city of Bozeman, Montana and which included Montana State University (MSU). 
Williams considered running for office as an independent, but chose to run as a Democrat. Three-term incumbent Brady Wiseman (D) was retiring from office, and Williams faced Bethan Letiecq in the Democratic primary election. Letiecq emphasized her experience lobbying the state legislature on grandparental rights and immigration, as well as her work for the General Accountability Office, a federal agency. She proposed a windfall profits tax on oil companies to fund improvements in education. Williams emphasized her work for the state legislature and state agencies, arguing she was better qualified to achieve compromise when contentious issues arose. She said she was not a single-issue candidate, pointing to her work with the Montana League of Women Voters on education and healthcare. She said her work in the legislature would focus on improving Montana's economy by promoting sustainable industries and on developing a state energy policy. Williams won the primary election by a vote of 255 to 164 (60.8 to 39.2 percent).

Williams faced Republican Nick Mahan in the general election. Mahan, who worked servicing magnetic resonance imaging equipment, proposed a 3-to-5 percent across-the-board cut to the state budget, elimination of the business equipment tax, and a limit on the number bills that could be introduced in each 90-day legislative session. He portrayed Williams as in favor of more bureaucracy and higher taxes. Williams was endorsed by Wiseman, and focused her campaign on the economy, education, and the environment. She continued to emphasize her experience working for the state legislature and state agencies. Williams won the general election by a vote of 1,288 to 665 (65.9 to 33.1 percent).

2011 session of the Montana House of Representatives
Williams was assigned to the House agriculture, natural resources, and taxation committees. She sponsored a successful bill (H.B. 615) which required health insurance companies to provide routine cancer treatment to patients in clinical trials.

Williams's first term in office occurred in the wake of the Great Recession of 2008–2010. She says she gained a much deeper appreciation for the importance of a diversified economy and workforce development during this period. Beginning with her first term and service on the House Committee on Natural Resources, Williams sought to protect the water rights of irrigators and the right of sport fishermen to healthy fisheries protected by adequate water flows.

2012 election
Williams was re-elected to the Montana Legislature in 2012. She was unopposed in the 2012 Democratic primary. Williams faced Nick Mahan again in the general election. Mahan focused his campaign on improving the economy, opposing expansion in the size of government, lowering taxes, and "keeping MSU thriving". He proposed keeping some of the state's $460 million ($ in  dollars) budget surplus in reserve and returning the rest to taxpayers, expansion of energy exploration and production, and using a portion of the state natural resource tax to fund education. Mahan said he favored a tuition freeze at MSU so long as it did not impair the university. Williams once more focused on the economy, education and the environment. Her highest priorities in the legislature would also include healthcare accessibility and affordability; protecting stream access for sportsmen and recreational users; and more equitable funding for the state's school system. Williams said she was open to a tuition freeze at MSU, but also wanted to improve pay for faculty and staff at the school.

Williams won the general election by a vote of 2,298 to 989 (69.9 to 30.1 percent).

In November 2012, Williams was appointed to the Montana Reserved Water Rights Commission.

2013 session of the Montana House of Representatives
Williams was assigned to the House agriculture, natural resources, rules, and taxation committees. She served as the Minority Vice Chair of the Agriculture Committee. Williams helped write a bill which ordered a study of whether water wells and septic systems should be exempt from environmental regulation. The legislature approved the study rather than adopt legislation that would have legalized this exemption.

During the 2013 legislative session, Williams took the lead in helping to win legislative approval for the Compact and Ordinance for the Flathead Reservation Water Rights Settlement, an agreement between the U.S. federal government, the state of Montana, and the Confederated Salish and Kootenai Tribes that defines water rights for the tribes as well as affects water use across western Montana. The tribes had threatened to sue to enforce their rights in the Montana Water Court, litigation that might have taken years to resolve and cost the state hundreds of millions of dollars. Negotiations on the compact had taken more than a decade, and legislative approval proved highly contentious.

Williams was appointed to and served as Minority Vice Chair of the Montana Legislature's Water Policy Committee, which met during the interim between the 2013 and 2015 legislative sessions to collect information, analyze, and report to the legislature concerning water policy issues in the state.

2014 election
Williams was re-elected to the Montana Legislature in 2014. After the 2010 United States Census, Montana's state legislature underwent redistricting. House district 65 shifted to northeast Bozeman. House district 61 shifted to a large, less densely populated area north and east of the old House district 65. MSU was shifted into House district 63. The local newspaper described Williams' new district as leaning Democratic.

Williams was unopposed in the 2014 Democratic primary. Williams faced Nick Mahan for a third time in the general election. Mahan campaigned on reducing the size of government and promoting the free market. He proposed using state energy production taxes to fund a statewide college tuition aid program and infrastructure improvements in eastern Montana, scaling back regulations on energy production, and transferring federally owned land to state control. Mahan opposed Medicaid expansion, disclaimed a belief in climate change, and called many people in eastern Montana and those who used Medicaid "welfare-dependent". Williams campaigned primarily on healthcare. She said her legislative focus would be on healthcare issues "that really need to be fixed", such as lowering prescription drug costs. Although she said she would consider Medicaid expansion, she advocated first having a "broad dialogue" on healthcare that would consider a wide range of solutions. Other issues she intended to work on included the deregulation of non-hazardous homemade foods, improving tax equity to reduce property tax burdens for people on fixed incomes, eliminating the tax holiday on new oil and natural gas wells and using the revenue for public schools, and improving the state's railroad plan to reduce emergency service response times.

Williams won the general election by a vote of 2,975 to 2,187 (57.6 to 42.4 percent).

2015 session of the Montana House of Representatives
Williams was assigned to the House agriculture, natural resources, rules, and taxation committees. She served as the Minority Vice Chair of the Taxation Committee. Williams introduced and won passage of HB 478, a food safety law that expanded the kind of homemade foods allowed to be sold at home, farmers' markets, mobile venues (such as food trucks), online, or at other public or private venues. Williams also introduced and won passage of HB 258, the Montana Benefit Corporation Act. The legislation authorized the establishment of for-profit public benefit corporations in the state.

Williams again agreed to shepherd the Compact and Ordinance for the Flathead Reservation Water Rights Settlement during the 2015 legislative session. She succeeded in winning the legislature's approval of the bill. She opposed two major tax cut bills supported by the Republican majority, arguing that piecemeal tax reform avoided the issue of overhauling the entire tax code and did not achieve property tax fairness for those on fixed incomes.

Western Landowners Alliance
After serving three terms in the Montana House of Representatives, Williams declined to seek re-election in 2016.
 She later said she decided not to seek a fourth term in the Montana House of Representatives in order to run for federal office.

In 2014, Williams took a position as an associate director for water policy issues at the Western Landowners Alliance, a nonprofit group of private landowners that formed in 2011 to serve as a clearinghouse on science and strategies to create economically viable, sustainable ranches and other working lands while also protecting watersheds and wildlife.

U.S. House of Representatives

2018

June 2018 Democratic primary
On October 24, 2017, Williams announced she would enter the Democratic Party primary to represent Montana's at-large district in the U.S. House of Representatives. Most political observers considered her candidacy a "long shot". Williams entered an already-crowded field of challengers that included John Heenan, an attorney from Billings (the state's largest city); Grant Kier, director of a Missoula-based nonprofit conservation organization; Lynda Moss, a former state legislator; and Tom Woods, also a former state legislator. She also entered the election relatively late, months after the first two candidates declared. Williams also trailed in fundraising: at the end of 2017, Heenan and Kier both had raised more than $250,000 to Williams's $73,000.

In announcing her candidacy, Williams said her top two issues were healthcare and tax reform. She believed the Tax Cuts and Jobs Act of 2017, promoted and signed into law by President Donald Trump, was fiscally irresponsible. She pledged that as a member of Congress, she would protect broad health insurance coverage for all Montanans and lower insurance and prescription drug costs; improve spending on education and workforce development; protect the right to form a union; end discrimination in all forms; protect public lands; restore civility and integrity to Congress; and reassert the congressional role in foreign affairs. She also advocated improving economic diversity in Montana to ensure economic growth, and protecting economic development programs aimed at rural areas (such as the Farm Bill, funding for rural healthcare, and the USDA Rural Development agency). A proponent of legal immigration, Williams said she supported ideas put forth by border-state legislators to use modern technology to strengthen the border with Mexico. She opposed tariffs because they hurt Montana's agricultural exporters.

Williams began her campaign emphasizing her experience and success as a Democratic lawmaker in a Republican-controlled legislature, her ability to appeal to both parties while serving as nonpartisan legislative staff, and her work for private farmers and ranchers in promoting conservation. Williams also laid claim to the legacy of Republican feminist and legendary Montana politician Jeannette Rankin, saying she hoped to be Rankin's "long overdue successor".

Williams adopted a campaign strategy of visiting "all corners of the state". She traveled in her own Prius and pickup truck, towing a camper behind her. At one point, she drove more than  crisscrossing the state in a single week. She emphasized her plan to allow people 55-to-64 years of age to buy into Medicare and her proposal to allow Medicare to bargain with pharmaceutical companies in order to reduce prescription drug prices. She also began emphasizing a return to civility in Congress. Lacking the funds to run television advertisements statewide, Williams's ad buys focused on geographic areas where she believed she could boost her vote totals (such as Missoula County). Ads on her healthcare ideas featured her work helping constituents and her own mother's battle with Alzheimer's disease, which political observers felt were highly effective.

After the shooting at Marjory Stoneman Douglas High School in Parkland, Florida, Williams came out with several gun control proposals. A gun owner, hunter, and sport shooter, Williams advocated for universal background checks and a ban on bump stocks. She also proposed banning the use of AR-15 style rifles outside of controlled environments like shooting ranges. She also proposed that Congress regulate military assault-style weapons the same way it regulates machine guns.

Despite being outspent roughly two-to-one, Williams won the June 5 Democratic primary with 37,146 votes (33.5 percent of votes cast). John Heenan came in second with 35,154 votes (31.7 percent), and Grant Kier had 26,832 votes (24.2 percent). Williams won nearly half of the state's counties. 
Robert Saldin, a professor of political science at the University of Montana, observed that where Williams didn't win, she came in second. Moreover, although other candidates showed large vote totals only in pockets across the state, Williams ran strongly statewide. Voter turnout was particularly high in Gallatin County, where Williams resides. A record 12,707 primary votes were cast there. This helped to offset Heenan's vote totals in his home county of Yellowstone, Montana's most populous county. Williams' targeted advertising strategy also paid off in Missoula. Williams polled nearly as many votes as Kier in his home county of Missoula. She won four of the five surrounding counties as well.

November 2018 general election

Williams received endorsements from different Montana newspapers over Gianforte. Amongst them were the Billings Gazette, the Bozeman Daily Chronicle, and the Missoulian

Williams lost the general election with 233,284 votes (46.2%) against incumbent Greg Gianforte, who received 256,611 votes (50.9%), and Libertarian Party Candidate Elinor Swanson (2.9%).

2020
Williams was again the Democratic nominee for the House of Representative in 2020, losing to State Auditor Matt Rosendale.

Political positions

Health care 
Williams has said her number one priority is health care policy because she believes health care in Montana is too expensive. She supports preserving affordable insurance coverage for people with pre-existing conditions and would allow people aged 55 to 64 to buy in to Medicare if they prefer it over their other insurance options. She seeks to lower the cost of prescription drugs. She would fight the Trump administration's decision to allow businesses to pursue new uses for asbestos.

Local issues 
Williams believes the Montana government has ignored regional concerns of residents, especially in rural areas. She traveled over 42,000 miles in her hybrid car to talk to locals, and keeps a running list of local concerns from every stop along with the name and contact numbers of the people who raised the concerns. For example, she would pursue an irrigation project for sugar beet farmers in Sidney, build a levee to protect Miles City from flooding, and address the 20-year asbestos health crisis in Libby.

Personal life
Williams is an avid fisher, hiker, hunter, and skier. She is a gun owner and has participated in shooting sports. Williams is a member of and has worked extensively with the League of Women Voters, and is the former vice chair of the Greater Gallatin Watershed Council (a water conservation and water quality group in Gallatin County).

Williams married Tom Pick, an agricultural development contractor during the Iraq War, in the rotunda of the Montana State Capitol building in 2001. She became stepmother to his two adult sons, Calen and Sander. Pick died in January 2016 at the age of 67.

Electoral results

2010

2012

2014

2018

2020

Notes

References

Bibliography

External links
 Kathleen for Montana campaign website

 
 

|-

1961 births
American conservationists
American women environmentalists
Colorado State University alumni
Living people
Democratic Party members of the Montana House of Representatives
Politicians from Bozeman, Montana
UC Berkeley College of Natural Resources alumni
Women state legislators in Montana
Candidates in the 2018 United States elections
Candidates in the 2020 United States elections
21st-century American women politicians